The flag of the exclave of Kaliningrad Oblast is a rectangle with a ratio of 2:3 divided into three horizontal stripes. The upper stripe is red having in the canton a silver-and-black stylized medieval castle with open gates and the monogram of Empress Elizabeth Petrovna (under which reign parts of the region were shortly under Russian control during the Seven Years' War), a thin (1/3 of the upper strip) yellow stripe in the middle and a dark blue stripe of the same size as the red bar.

The law does not state what the colours stand for. In the Russian press it was stated that the silver fortress with open gates stands for hospitality, the dark blue for the Baltic Sea and tranquility, the yellow for the wealth of amber and the red for active man principle ("цвет активного мужского начала"). (Other sources state that red stands for the bellicose past of Prussia, the Red Army, the Hanseatic League, or the historical connections with Brandenburg and Poland.)

The law about the flag and the coat of arms went into effect on 9 June 2006. Previously this westernmost Russian region had no flag. When plans were made to adopt a flag another proposal was a tricolour with 3 horizontal stripes in green, white and dark blue similar to the flag of Sierra Leone. Another proposal was similar to the flag of Scotland, but with a yellow St. Andrew's Cross.

Notes

External links
Law of Kaliningrad region (# 16) about coat of arms and flag of Kaliningrad region 

Flag
Flags of the federal subjects of Russia
Kaliningrad